Assencières is a commune in the Aube department in the Grand Est region of north-central France.

Geography
Assencières is located some 11 km north-east of Troyes and 8 km south-east of Charmont-sous-Barbuise. Access to the commune is by the D 8 road from Luyères in the north passing through the village and the heart of the commune and continuing to Mesnil-Sellières in the south. The D 100 also starts from the village and goes north-east to Bouy-Luxembourg. There is a railway passing through the commune from Charmont-sous-Barbuise in the north to La Chapelle-Saint-Luc in the south-west but there is no station in or near the commune. The commune is entirely flat farmland.

Neighbouring communes and villages

Administration

List of Successive Mayors

Demography
In 2017 the commune had 171 inhabitants.

Sites and monuments

The Church of Saint-Pierre and Saint-Paul used to have three naves from the 16th century which collapsed in 1947. There are many items which are registered as historical objects:
Stoup (17th century)
Sculpture: Christ on the cross (19th century)
Main Altar, Tabernacle, and Retable (18th century)
Retable star (18th century)
Statue: Saint-Pierre (16th century)
Statue: Saint-Fiacre (16th century)
Processional cross (17th century)
Group Sculpture: Christ & 2 angels with the instruments of the Passion (16th century)
Stained glass windows: Death of the Virgin (16th century)
Statue: Virgin & child (16th century)
Stained glass windows: Visitation of Saint-Pierre (16th century)
Reliquary-bust: Saint-Fiacre (18th century)
Bronze Bell (17th century)
Choir balustrade (18th century)
Stained glass window: the Crucifixion (16th century)
Glass figure in Bay 2 (15th century)
Glass figure in Bay 0 (15th century)

Notable people linked to the commune
Alexandre Marchais, who was called Le Mose, was born in 1962 and spent his childhood in Assencières. He made his first steps in performing at parties before turning to street music and eventually join a travelling troupe of acrobats. But it was in the gypsy community that he is known by becoming one of the leading exponents of ericius music.

See also
Communes of the Aube department
Parc naturel régional de la Forêt d'Orient

References

External links
Assencières on Géoportail, National Geographic Institute (IGN) website 
Aßencieres on the 1750 Cassini Map

Communes of Aube